The 17th World Sports Acrobatics Championships were held in Wrocław, Poland from November 2 to November 5, 2000.

Men's Group

Overall

Balance

Tempo

Men's Pair

Overall

Balance

Tempo

Mixed Pair

Overall

Balance

Tempo

Women's Group

Overall

Balance

Tempo

Women's Pair

Overall

Balance

Tempo

References
FIG official site

Acrobatic Gymnastics Championships
Acrobatic Gymnastics World Championships
Acrobatic
Acrobatic